Carotene epsilon-monooxygenase (CYP97C1, LUT1) is an enzyme with systematic name alpha-carotene:oxygen oxidoreductase (3-hydroxylating). This enzyme catalyses the following chemical reaction

 alpha-carotene + O2 + AH2  alpha-cryptoxanthin + A + H2O

Carotene epsilon-monooxygenase is a heme-thiolate protein (P450)..

References

External links 
 

EC 1.14.99